The 2021 E3 Saxo Bank Classic was a road cycling one-day race that took place on 26 March 2021 in Belgium. It was the 63rd edition of the E3 Saxo Bank Classic, and the 9th event of the 2021 UCI World Tour.

Teams
Twenty-five teams were invited to the race, including all nineteen UCI WorldTeams and six UCI ProTeams.  were not allowed to start due to rider Matthew Walls testing positive for COVID-19.

UCI WorldTeams

 
 
 
 
 
 
 
 
 
 
 
 
 
 
 
 
 
 
 

UCI ProTeams

Result

References

E3 Saxo Bank Classic
E3 Saxo Bank Classic
E3 Saxo Bank Classic
2021